Nedal "Skinny" Hussein (born 1 December 1977) is an Australian professional boxer who competed from 1997 to 2007.

Hussein won several titles, including: the Australian super bantamweight title, Australian bantamweight title, International Boxing Federation (IBF) Pan Pacific featherweight title, World Boxing Federation (WBF) featherweight title, World Boxing Union (WBU) super bantamweight title, World Boxing Organization (WBO) Asia Pacific super featherweight title, International Boxing Federation (IBF) Pan Pacific super featherweight title, International Boxing Organization (IBO) Inter-Continental super featherweight title, and Commonwealth super bantamweight title.

Hussein was a challenger for the World Boxing Council (WBC) International super bantamweight title, fighting Manny Pacquiao. He took part in the World Boxing Council (WBC) super bantamweight title against Óscar Larios, World Boxing Organization (WBO) featherweight title against Scott Harrison, Oriental and Pacific Boxing Federation (OPBF) featherweight title against Hiroyuki Enoki, and Oriental and Pacific Boxing Federation (OPBF) super featherweight title against Takashi Uchiyama. His fighting weight varied from bantamweight to lightweight.

Professional boxing record

Nedal was involved in 48 fights throughout his career. 43 of these fights resulted in victory (27 by knockout and 16 by decision). Nedal has only been defeated in 5 fights (2 by knockout and 3 by decision).

References

External links

Image - Nedal Hussein

1977 births
Living people
Australian male boxers
Bantamweight boxers
Boxers from Sydney
Featherweight boxers
Lightweight boxers
Place of birth missing (living people)
Super-bantamweight boxers
Super-featherweight boxers